Brachiaria nigropedata (spotted brachiaria) is a perennial grass belonging to the grass family (Poaceae). It is native to Southern Africa the tropical regions of South Africa and East Africa. Brachiaria nigropedata is used as fodder grass in Namibia.
As a pioneering grass, it has also environmental uses such as revegetation and soil binding.

References

Flora of Namibia
Panicoideae